Institute of Foreign Affairs, Nepal (Nepali: परराष्ट्र मामिला अध्ययन प्रतिष्ठान), abbreviated as IFA, is a policy research think tank patronized by Ministry of Foreign Affairs, Nepal.

Minister of Foreign Affairs heads the board of directors of the institute and presently, Mr. Rajesh Shrestha is the executive director, and Dr. Rupak Sapkota is assigned as a deputy executive director of the institute.

References

Think tanks based in Asia
Think tanks established in 1993
1993 establishments in Nepal
Government of Nepal
Organisations based in Kathmandu